An Caisteal is a hill fort located on the island of Coll. This island is one of the islands which make up the Inner Hebrides located on the west coast of Scotland. Located   to the north-east of An Caisteal is Dùn Foulag.

Description

The fort is known locally as An Caisteal, which translates into English as "the castle". The early 20th century antiquary Erskine Beveridge considered Dùn Foulag to be a dun and thought he found evidence of a defensive wall. The current opinion, however, is that it is just a naturally rocky knoll. This once supposed dun was visited in 1972 by the Ordnance Survey (OS) who could find no trace of antiquity on site; and currently the Royal Commission on the Ancient and Historical Monuments of Scotland (RCAHMS) classifies it a 'natural feature'. What Beveridge thought was a defensive wall is now considered to be the remains of a modern building; what he thought were "fallen stones" are only beach stones.

Three sides of this cliff are extremely sheer; in some places all the way, to the ground below. The rock is inaccessible on these three sides; although it is accessible from the north over a natural terrace. This terrace is a narrow shelf which ascends around the cliff-face to on the north-west of the cliff.

The fort's main wall occupied the crest of a terrace, on the north and east sides; on the south side, the wall followed the cliff-edge. According to the RCAHMS, only a small proportion of this area would have been inhabitable, since large areas of this space are covered with bare rock. There are traces of an outer wall which would have guarded the easiest approach to the fort. This wall lines a part of the lower terrace on the north-west.

When Beveridge visited and documented An Caisteal he found one of two "doubtful" hammerstones at the site.

References

Archaeological sites in the Northern Inner Hebrides
Coll
Fortifications in Scotland